The following are public holidays in Haiti. Many Vodou holidays are also celebrated, but are not considered public holidays.

The two most important holidays for Haitian Americans are Haitian Independence Day and Haitian Flag Day.

In addition, the following Christian holidays are celebrated; their dates vary according to the date of Easter each year.

References 

 
Haiti
Holidays
Haitian culture